The 1973 Australian Rally Championship was a series of six rallying events held across Australia. It was the sixth season in the history of the competition.

Peter Lang and navigator Warwick Smith in the Holden Torana GTR XU-1 were the winners of the 1973 Championship.

Season review
The sixth Australian Rally Championship was decided over six events, staged across the Eastern States of Australia with two events each in New South Wales and Victoria and one each in Queensland and South Australia.  The series saw more domination from the Holden Torana GTR XU-1's which won all six rounds, three wins for Peter Lang/Warwick Smith, two wins for Colin Bond/George Shepheard and one win for Steward McLeod/Adrian Mortimer.  Lang and Smith managed high placings in the events that they didn't win and thus convincingly took out the 1973 championship.

The Rallies

The six events of the 1973 season were as follows.

Round One – Uniroyal Southern 500 Rally

Round Two – Classic Rally

Round Three – Bunbury Curran Rally

Round Four – Bega Valley Rally

Round Five – Warana Rally

Round Six – Golden Alpine Rally
Note that Kilfoyle and Osborne won this event outright in a works Datsun 180B SSS but were ineligible for ARC points.

1973 Drivers and Navigators Championships
Final pointscore for 1973 is as follows.

Peter Lang – Champion Driver 1973

Warwick Smith – Champion Navigator 1973

References

External links
  Results of Snowy Mountains Rally and ARC results.

Rally Championship
Rally competitions in Australia
1973 in rallying